Al-Sadd FC is a Saudi Arabian professional football team based in Al-Kharj, that competes in the Saudi Second Division.

Current squad 
As of Saudi Second Division:

References

External links
 Al Sadd FC at Kooora.com

Sadd
1979 establishments in Saudi Arabia
Association football clubs established in 1979
Football clubs in Al-Kharj